The Economic Court of the Commonwealth of Independent States is a judicial organ which was formed in order to provide exercising of its economic commitments by the participating states. The Court is empowered to consider the disputes in the fulfillment of economic commitments in accordance with international treaties within the framework of the Commonwealth of Independent States. The Court considers other disputes under the agreement of the participating states. It is also empowered to interpret international treaties and the acts of the CIS bodies. The location of the Economic Court is the city of Minsk, Republic of Belarus.

History 
For the first time the idea of creation of judicial body within the CIS was proposed and then mentioned in the Agreement on cooperation of economic and arbitration courts of Belarus, Russian Federation and the Ukraine dated 21 December 1991, on the day when Alma-Ata Declaration was signed. In the article 12 of this Agreement, national courts of the CIS confirmed the necessity of formation, as part of Commonwealth structure, of special arbitration organ (Economic Court). On interstate level, when the Agreement on measures of providing improvement of payments between economic organizations of the CIS participating states dated 15 May 1992 was being signed, it was made a decision on creation of the CIS judicial organ (named the Commercial Court of the Commonwealth). The main purpose of the Commercial Court of the Commonwealth was settlement of interstate economic disputes that cannot be referred to the competence of higher economic (arbitration) national courts of Commonwealth states (article 5 of the Agreement).

On 6 July 1992 the Agreement on the status of the Economic Court of the Commonwealth of Independent States was signed, and its inherent part was the Provision on the Economic Court of the Commonwealth of Independent States. This Provision is a legal basis of the Court's activity.

In the Statute of the Commonwealth of Independent States approved by the Council of Heads of States of the CIS on 22 January 1993, Part IV, Economic Court was mentioned as one of the CIS bodies.

In the article 3 of the Agreement on the status of the Economic Court of the Commonwealth of Independent States, it is said that the location of the Court shall be Minsk, Republic of Belarus. The Treaty between the Republic of Belarus and the Economic Court of the Commonwealth of Independent States about the terms of residence of the Economic Court of the Commonwealth of Independent States on the territory of Belarus was signed on 22 November 1996.

State-parties to the Agreement on the status of the Economic Court 
The Agreement on the status of the Economic Court of the Commonwealth of Independent States came into force in 1992 for Belarus, Russian Federation, Uzbekistan, in 1993 – for Armenia, in 1994 – for Kazakhstan, Kyrgyzstan and Tajikistan, in 1995 – for Moldova. In 2006 Armenia quit the Agreement. Moldova quit the Agreement in 2010.

In 1997 Azerbaijan tried to join the Agreement on the status of the Economic Court with some stipulations, but state-parties were against such joinder as stipulations seemed unacceptable.

Competence 
The competence of the Economic Court is determined by the rules of the CIS Charter and the Provision on the Economic Court, approved by the Agreement on the status of the Economic Court. According to the article 32 of the CIS Charter, the Court is empowered to settle disputes which can appear in the fulfillment of economic commitments within the framework of the CIS, to interpret provisions of international agreements and the CIS acts related to the economic issues, to settle other disputes related to its jurisdiction by the CIS participating states. In accordance with the article 3 of the Provision on the Economic Court of the Commonwealth of Independent States, the Court settles interstate economic disputes: which appear in the fulfillment of economic commitments, provided by the CIS international agreements, decisions made by the Council of the Heads of States, the CIS Council of the Heads of Governments and its other institutions; on the correspondence of statutory and other acts of participating states, passed on economic issues, international agreements and other acts of the CIS. Other disputes, connected with the fulfillment of international agreements and other CIS acts passed on its basis (today there are 36 such international agreements).

In accordance with the article 5 of the Provision on the Economic Court, the Court is also empowered to interpret: international agreements, another CIS acts and its institutions; acts of legislation of the former SSR for the period of its mutually agreed enforcement, including those about permissibility of enforcement of such acts, as the acts which do not contradict international agreements and passed on its basis another CIS acts. Such interpretation is carried out in taking decisions on particular cases, and also special requests.

The right of access to the Economic Court 
In accordance with the Provision on the Economic Court, states concerned represented by its competent organs, and also CIS institutions have the right to go to the Court for consideration of disputes.

The highest agencies of power and government of participating states, CIS institutions, superior economic and arbitration courts and other superior organs that are empowered to settle economic disputes, which can appear on the territory of participating states, can appeal to the Economic Court with requests for interpretation of the CIS international agreements and other acts.

The Economic Court is not empowered to consider disputes or requests for interpretation, introduced by economic agents or natural persons. At the same time in the Court's practice were considered such kind of requests, which were taken to the Court indirectly, through the competent organs of states and CIS institutions.

Status of the Court’s decisions 
According to the Provision on the Economic Court subsequent to the results of consideration of disputes the Economic Court makes decision, where the fact of law infringement, by participating state, of international agreement or CIS act or act of the CIS, its institution, is ascertained. Then some measures, which are recommended for such state in order to eliminate the infringement and its consequences, are defined. When the Economic Court of the CIS makes a decision, the state, concerning the decision being made, provides its execution. Thus, the legal force is not determined straight by constituent documents of the Court. In the literature, there is an opinion that the Court's decisions have binding character with regard to legal qualification of aspects of the case and the character of recommendation with regard to the measures on elimination the infringement and its consequences undertaken by the state.

The decisions of the Economic Court and the enactments of the Plenum are to be published in the CIS publications and mass media of the participating states.

The fulfillment of the functions of the EurAsEC Court 
From 2004 to 2011 the Economic Court was performing functions of the Court of the Eurasian Economic Community in accordance with the Agreement between the Commonwealth of Independent States and the Eurasian Economic Community on fulfillment by the Economic Court of the Commonwealth of Independent States the functions of the EurAsEC Court dated 3 March 2004 (with changes, submitted by the Protocol dated 17 January 2011). This agreement was denounced on 1 January 2012. Within the framework of fulfillment of the functions of the EurAsEC Court the jurisdiction of the Economic Court was extended on interstate disputes of economic character, which can appear on application of international EurAsEC agreements, decisions of EurAsEC organs, fulfillment of commitments, following from such acts, other disputes, provided by the EurAsEC agreements, and also on interpretation of the provisions of international agreements and decisions of EurAsEC organs.

Judges 
The Judge panel of the Economic Court of the Commonwealth of Independent States is formed from equal number of judges from each state-party of the agreement on the status of the Economic Court. In accordance with the article 2 of the agreement, the quota number of judges from each state-party is two people. By the decision of the Council of the Heads of States of the CIS about measures on further enhancement of efficiency of the CIS organs and optimization of its structure dated 2 October 2002, the number of judges was reduced to 1 judge from each state.

In accordance with the article 7 of the Provision on the Economic Court of the CIS all judges are elected (appointed) by state-parties in the way, which is determined in those states, for election (appointment) of judges of higher economic, arbitration courts for a 10-year period, strictly on the professional ground, among judges of economic, arbitration courts and other persons, who must be specialists of high proficiency in the field of economic legal relations, also they must have higher juridical education. The Economic Court President and his Deputy are elected by the judges of the Court by majority vote and approved by the Council of the Heads of States for a 5-year period.

Now 2 judges perform their duties at the Economic Court: from Belarus – Ludmila Kamenkova (appointed in 2008); from Russian Federation – Evelina Nagornaya (appointed in 2013).

On 15 December 2011 the President of the Economic Court became Ludmila Kamenkova.

Structure of the Court 
The Economic Court discharges its duties as a full panel of Economic Court, but it also may form the Economic Court collegiums and convoke the Plenum of the Economic Court.

Full panel of the Economic Court is composed of all judges from the Court and is convoked for consideration the cases on requests for interpretation. Full panel of the Court is eligible to make decision, if on its session are present not less than two thirds of all elected and proceeded to execute its duties judges of the Economic Court. When making a decision, each judge has one vote and has no right to abstain from voting. Decisions are made by simple majority vote from the number of judges who are present. When there is equality of votes, the decision the chairman of full staff had voted for is supposed to be made. The Decisions are made by the full staff of the Court are final and there will be no appeals.

The Economic Court collegiums are formed by full staff of the Court in number of 3 or 5 persons among the judges for consideration the disputes related to the competence of appropriate collegiums. The decision of collegium is made by majority vote of collegium's members. When there is equality of votes, the decision the chairman of collegiums had voted for is supposed to be made. The Decision of collegiums can be appealed to the Plenum of the Economic Court by case parties or third persons.

Plenum of the Economic Court is supposed to be the higher collegiate organ of the Court and composed of the chairman of the Court, his deputies and judges of the Court, and also of chairmen of higher economic, arbitration courts and other higher state organs of participating states, settling economic disputes.

Court Practice 
From February 1994, when formation of material and technical foundation was accomplished and the Court's staff was formed, to 17 June 2016 the Economic Court considered 124 cases and 133 acts were accepted.

Interstate economic disputes 
Economic disputes between the CIS participating states compose moderate part of the cases that are considered by the Economic Court: for the first 20 years of the Court's functioning were considered 13 disputes. In some cases the Court made a decision on denial of case production or dismissal of a case.

The decisions on the cases about disputes may be classified according to the following categories: about improper fulfillment of economic commitments; about recognition of proprietorship, on collision between national legal norms and provisions of the CIS law.

Cases on interpretation 
Cases about interpretation compose main part of the cases that are considered by the Economic Court. By 17 June 2016 the Court had considered 111 cases on interpretation.

Among all cases considered by the Economic court it is possible to single out the following categories: 
 on interpretation of agreements and other acts of the Commonwealth regulating issues on fulfillment of international economic commitments – 17 cases;
 on interpretation of constituent documents and legal position of the CIS – 5 cases; 
 on interpretation of agreements and other acts of the CIS, regulating status and powers of organizations within the framework of the CIS, the CIS organs – 11 cases;
 on interpretation of correspondence of provisions of agreements, signed within the framework of the CIS, acts of the CIS organs to the standards and principles of international law – 9 cases;
 on interpretation of agreements, regulating the way of settling interstate disputes within the framework of the CIS – 8 cases;
 on interpretation of agreements, regulating cooperation of higher arbitration, economic and other courts of the participating states of the CIS concerning its procedural activity – 8 cases;
 on interpretation of agreements and other acts of the CIS organs, regulating issues of providing for social and economic rights of citizens of the CIS participating states – 45 cases;
 cases that are considered by the Economic Court within the framework of  fulfillment the functions of the EurAsEC Court – 1 case;
 other cases – 7 cases.

Notable decisions 
The Decision by the CIS Economic Court dated September 23, 2014 No. 01−1/1−14 on interpretation of the article 11 of the CIS Convention on protection of investors rights dated March 23, 1997 was nominated by Global Arbitration Review as one of the most important published decision of 2014 for jurisprudential or other reasons. It was commented as "preventing a potential flood of claims at so-called “pocket” arbitration courts".

The practice of execution of decisions of the Economic Court 
Conclusions and directions appearing in decisions of the Economic Court related to the cases about interpretation of provisions of international agreements, signed within the framework of the CIS, are used by competent organs of the participating states in practical activity, in preparation of the acts of the national legal system and development of international legal basis, are taken into consideration by experts when developing and coordinating agreements and decisions taken within the framework of the CIS.

Decisions of the Economic Court on cases about interpretation are used in practice of national judicial organs of Belarus and Russian Federation.

Reforming of the Court 
During a period of the Economic Court functioning, an opinion of improvement of its constituent documents was spoken up continually. So, the analysis of the Court's practice on consideration of interstate economic disputes – the main category of disputes in accordance with the constituent documents – shows that the Court's potential is not effectively employed.

In this regard the Conception of further development of the CIS, approved by the CIS Council of the Heads of States on 5 October 2007, and the Plan of main activities on its realization provides for modernization of the Economic Court of the CIS.

Within the framework of activities on modernization of the Economic Court, in 2012 special group of government experts had prepared the draft text of a new Agreement on the status of the Economic Court of the Commonwealth of Independent States, which however has not been put to the signature yet.

External links
The Official Website of the Economic Court (Russian)
Website of the Economic Court in English
Article on the Economic Court of the CIS
Information about procedure, cases, structure, jurisdiction etc. of the Court from WorldCourts.com

Notes

Commonwealth of Independent States
International courts and tribunals